The 1982 Basildon District Council election took place on 6 May 1982 to elect members of Basildon District Council in Essex, England. This was on the same day as other local elections. One third of the council was up for election; the seats of the candidates who finished second in each ward in the all-out election of 1979. The Labour Party gained control of the council, which had previously been under no overall control.

Overall results

|-
| colspan=2 style="text-align: right; margin-right: 1em" | Total
| style="text-align: right;" | 17
| colspan=5 |
| style="text-align: right;" | 42,094
| style="text-align: right;" |

Ward results

Billericay East (2 seats)

Billericay West

Burstead

Fryerns Central

Fryerns East

Laindon

Langdon Hills

Lee Chapel North (2 seats)

Nethermayne (2 seats)

Pitsea East

Pitsea West

Vange

Wickford North

Wickford South

References

1982
1982 English local elections
1980s in Essex